Pyrgospira ostrearum, common name the oyster turrid, is a species of sea snail, a marine gastropod mollusk in the family Pseudomelatomidae.

Description
The size of the shell varies between 13 mm and 25 mm.

The shell is concavely, rather narrowly shouldered, with a thread-like raised line at the suture. It is closely longitudinally ribbed below the periphery and decussated by raised revolving lines. The color of the shell is dingy yellow to purplish black.

Distribution
This species occurs in the Caribbean Sea, the Gulf of Mexico and off the Lesser Antilles; in the Atlantic Ocean from North Carolina, USA, to Eastern Brasil;  fossils have been found in Quaternary strata in Florida, USA, and in Panama; age range:  1.806 to 0.781 MaMa.

References

 Stearns, R.E.C. (1872a) Descriptions of new species of marine mollusks from the coast of Florida. Proceedings of the Boston Society of Natural History, 15, 21–24
 Rosenberg, G.; Moretzsohn, F.; García, E. F. (2009). Gastropoda (Mollusca) of the Gulf of Mexico, Pp. 579–699 in: Felder, D.L. and D.K. Camp (eds.), Gulf of Mexico–Origins, Waters, and Biota. Texas A&M Press, College Station, Texas
 A. J. W. Hendy, D. P. Buick, K. V. Bulinski, C. A. Ferguson, and A. I. Miller. 2008. Unpublished census data from Atlantic coastal plain and circum-Caribbean Neogene assemblages and taxonomic opinions.

External links
 

ostrearum
Gastropods described in 1872